This is a list of Portuguese television related events from 2008.

Events
19 January - Vânia Fernandes wins the third series of Operação triunfo.

Debuts

Television shows

2000s
Operação triunfo (2003-2011)

Ending this year

Births

Deaths